Dan Fasie (born 1 February 1987, Oradea, Romania) is a Romanian judoka. At the 2012 Summer Olympics he competed in the Men's 66 kg, but was defeated in the second round.

References

External links
 

Romanian male judoka
Living people
Olympic judoka of Romania
Judoka at the 2012 Summer Olympics
1987 births
Sportspeople from Oradea
20th-century Romanian people
21st-century Romanian people